The men's 800 metres middle distance event at the 1932 Summer Olympics took place on August 1 and August 2 at the Los Angeles Memorial Coliseum. Twenty-one athletes from 11 nations competed. The 1930 Olympic Congress in Berlin had reduced the limit from 4 athletes per NOC to 3 athletes. The event was won by Tommy Hampson, the fourth consecutive British victory (it would be the last in the streak) and fifth overall British title in the 800 metres. Canada won its first two 800 metres medals with silver (Alex Wilson) and bronze (Phil Edwards).

Background

This was the ninth appearance of the event, which is one of 12 athletics events to have been held at every Summer Olympics. None of the medalists from 1928 returned, but three finalists did: fourth-place finisher Phil Edwards of Canada, sixth-place finisher Séra Martin of France, and eighth-place finisher Jean Keller of France. American Ben Eastman would have been favored in the event, but he ran only in the 400 metres in Los Angeles. The field was otherwise "considered open."

New Zealand appeared in the event for the first time. Great Britain and the United States each made their eighth appearance, tied for the most among all nations.

Competition format

With only 21 athletes, the three-round format introduced in 1912 was impractical. Only two rounds were held, still with the nine-man final introduced in 1920. There were three semifinals with 7 athletes each; the top three runners in each semifinal advanced to the nine-man final.

Records

These were the standing world and Olympic records (in minutes) prior to the 1932 Summer Olympics.

Tommy Hampson broke the world record in the final, setting the new record at 1:49.7.

Schedule

Results

Semifinals

Three heats were held; the fastest three runners in each advanced to the final round.

Semifinal 1

Semifinal 2

Semifinal 3

Final

References

Athletics at the 1932 Summer Olympics
800 metres at the Olympics
Men's events at the 1932 Summer Olympics